Chen Min-jen is a Taiwanese engineer, academic, and politician who served as a member of the Legislative Yuan from 2005 to 2008.

Education
Chen studied nuclear engineering at National Tsing Hua University and completed a doctorate in the subject at Iowa State University in 1983. His dissertation was titled, Simulation of Plenum Thermo-Hydraulics in a Liquid Metal Fast Breeder Reactor Under a Buoyancy-Affected Condition.

Career 
Chen worked for Argonne National Laboratory and General Electric before serving as president and chief executive officer of Macromicro Technology.

He served on the Legislative Yuan in Taiwan between 2005 and 2008, as a representative of overseas Chinese affiliated with the Democratic Progressive Party. As a legislator, he commented on infrastructure projects led by the National Science Council.

References

Year of birth missing (living people)
Living people
Taiwanese chief executives
American emigrants to Taiwan
Taiwanese emigrants to the United States
Iowa State University alumni
National Tsing Hua University alumni
Members of the 6th Legislative Yuan
Democratic Progressive Party Members of the Legislative Yuan
Taiwanese nuclear engineers
Party List Members of the Legislative Yuan
Argonne National Laboratory people
American nuclear engineers
20th-century American engineers
American chief executives
General Electric employees
20th-century Taiwanese engineers